Urnula helvelloides is a species of fungus in the family Sarcosomataceae that is found in Europe and Asia. It was described as new to science in 1973.

References

External links

Fungi described in 1973
Fungi of Asia
Fungi of Europe
Pezizales